The 1998 Slovak Presidential elections were held from 20 January to 17 December 1998. The Slovak parliament failed to elect the new president of Slovakia which led to the introduction of a direct election in 1999. A candidate would’ve needed to receive 90 votes to be elected.

Voting

First Ballot

Second Ballot

Third Ballot

Fourth Ballot

Fifth Ballot

Remaining Ballots
There were another 4 ballots in which no candidate was registered. The last ballot was on 17 December.

References

Presidential elections in Slovakia
Slovakia
1998 in Slovakia
Indirect elections